Barbour County is a county in the southeastern part of the U.S. state of Alabama. As of the 2020 census, the population was 25,223. Its county seat is Clayton. Its largest city is Eufaula. Its name is in honor of James Barbour, who served as Governor of Virginia.

History
Barbour County was established on December 18, 1832, from former Muscogee homelands  and a portion of Pike County. Between the years of 1763 and 1783 the area which is now Barbour County was part of the colony of British West Florida.  After 1783 the region fell under the jurisdiction of the newly created United States of America. The Muscogee Creek Confederacy was removed to territory west of the Mississippi River. The fertile land was developed by southern migrants as large cotton plantations dependent on slave labor. Due to the number of slaves, the population was soon majority black, a proportion that continued for decades. In the 21st century, the population has a slight white majority, but blacks make up more than 46% of the residents, which results in highly competitive politics.

In 1833, Louisville was chosen as the first county seat for Barbour County. The county seat was moved in 1834, after an eleven-member committee selected Clayton because of its central geographic location. Its boundaries were altered in 1866 and 1868. The Election Riot of 1874 occurred near Comer.

By the 1870s, the city of Eufaula had surpassed Clayton in size, sparking debate about whether the county seat should be moved to the county's commercial center or remain at its geographic center. Reaching a compromise, the legislature passed Act No. 106 on February 12, 1879, to establish county courts in both Eufaula and Clayton. Today, two county courthouses continue to operate in Barbour County.

Geography
The county is located within the Wiregrass region of southeast Alabama.

Major highways
 U.S. Highway 82
 U.S. Highway 431
 State Route 10
 State Route 30
 State Route 51
 State Route 95
 State Route 130
 State Route 131
 State Route 165
 State Route 198
 State Route 239

Adjacent counties
Russell County - northeast
Quitman County, Georgia - east
Stewart County, Georgia - east
Clay County, Georgia - southeast
Henry County - south
Dale County - south
Pike County - west
Bullock County - northwest

National protected area
 Eufaula National Wildlife Refuge (part)

Demographics

2020 census

As of the 2020 United States census, there were 25,223 people, 9,345 households, and 6,187 families residing in the county.

2010 census
As of the 2010 United States census, there were 27,457 people living in the county. 48.0% were White, 46.9% Black or African American, 0.4% Native American, 0.4% Asian, 0.1% Pacific Islander, 3.3% of some other race and 0.9% of two or more races. 5.1% were Hispanic or Latino (of any race).

2000 census
As of the census of 2000, there were 29,038 people, 10,409 households, and 7,390 families living in the county.  The population density was 33 people per square mile (13/km2).  There were 12,461 housing units at an average density of 14 per square mile (5/km2).  The racial makeup of the county was 51.27% White, 46.32% Black or African American, 0.45% Native American, 0.29% Asian, 0.03% Pacific Islander, 0.91% from other races, and 0.73% from two or more races.  1.65% of the population were Hispanic or Latino of any race.  There were 670 people who spoke Spanish in their home.  The only other language with over 100 speakers was French at 105.

In 2005 Barbour County had a population that was 49.5% non-Hispanic whites.  46.8% of the population was African-American.  0.3% of the population reported more than one race.  Latinos were now 3.1% of the population.  0.4% were Native American and 0.3% were Asian. (Sources census quickfacts)

In 2000 There were 10,409 households, out of which 33.30% had children under the age of 18 living with them, 47.90% were married couples living together, 19.10% had a female householder with no husband present, and 29.00% were non-families. 26.50% of all households were made up of individuals, and 12.10% had someone living alone who was 65 years of age or older.  The average household size was 2.53 and the average family size was 3.04.

In the county, the population was spread out, with 25.40% under the age of 18, 9.30% from 18 to 24, 29.60% from 25 to 44, 22.40% from 45 to 64, and 13.30% who were 65 years of age or older.  The median age was 36 years. For every 100 females there were 106.40 males.  For every 100 females age 18 and over, there were 106.80 males.

The median income for a household in the county was $25,101, and the median income for a family was $31,877. Males had a median income of $28,441 versus $19,882 for females. The per capita income for the county was $13,316.  About 21.60% of families and 26.80% of the population were below the poverty line, including 37.10% of those under age 18 and 26.40% of those age 65 or over.

In 2000, the largest denominational groups were Evangelical Protestants (with 8,935 adherents) and Mainline Protestants (with 2,492 adherents). The largest religious bodies were The Southern Baptist Convention (with 7,576 members) and The United Methodist Church (with 1,811 members).

Education
Barbour County contains two public school districts. There are approximately 7,100 students in public K-12 schools in Barbour County. 

The county contains one public higher education institution. Wallace Community College operates a campus located in Eufaula.

Districts 
School districts include:

 Barbour County School District
 Eufaula City School District

Government
Having been a historically Democratic county for much of the 20th century, the county has become more competitive. It has now voted for the Republican presidential candidate in four of the last five elections.

Communities

Cities

 Clio
 Eufaula

Towns

 Bakerhill
 Blue Springs
 Clayton (County Seat)
 Louisville

Unincorporated communities

 Batesville
 Elamville
 Spring Hill
 Teals Crossroads

Places of interest
Barbour County is home to Lakepoint Resort State Park, Blue Springs State Park, and the Eufaula National Wildlife Refuge.

Notable people

Governors from Barbour County
As a center of the planter elite class, Barbour County has produced more Alabama governors than any other county in the state. Six elected governors as well as two acting governors have lived in the county. In 2000, the Barbour County Governors' Trail was established by an act of the Alabama Legislature to honor the eight distinguished men and women who have served as governor from the county.

Marking changes in 20th-century politics, Chauncey Sparks, the Wallaces, and Jere Beasley were not from the planter elite.

See also
National Register of Historic Places listings in Barbour County, Alabama
Properties on the Alabama Register of Landmarks and Heritage in Barbour County, Alabama

References

Further reading
Trayvick, J.C. (2005). Soil survey of Barbour County, Alabama. Washington, D.C.: U.S. Department of Agriculture, Natural Resources Conservation Service.

External links
Barbour Weather
Barbour County Clerk of Court
Zone 1 News - Breaking News, Investigative Reports, Video Coverage
Barbour County Sheriff's Office

 

 
1832 establishments in Alabama
Populated places established in 1832
Majority-minority counties in Alabama